Bailey Brook, also referred to as Bailey's Brook was a dispersed rural community in the Canadian province of Nova Scotia, located  in Pictou County. The name was officially rescinded in 1961. Originally known as Baillies Brook, the area was settled by Scottish immigrants in 1790 and again in 1802.
It was the childhood home of military nurse Margaret C. MacDonald.

References

Communities in Pictou County